FK IMT is a professional football club based in New Belgrade, Serbia. They compete in the Serbian First League, the second tier of the national league system.

History
The club was founded by the agricultural machinery manufacturer of the same name in 1953. They won the Belgrade Zone League in the 1986–87 season and took promotion to the fourth tier of Yugoslav football.

After winning the Belgrade Zone League in 2014, the club earned promotion to the Serbian League Belgrade. They would compete in the third tier of Serbian football over the next six seasons. In the COVID-19-suspended 2019–20 season, the club finished in first place and gained promotion to the Serbian First League, thus reaching the second tier for the first time in history.

Honours
Serbian League Belgrade (Tier 3)
 2019–20
Belgrade Zone League (Tier 4)
 2013–14

Seasons

Players

First-team squad

Notable players
This is a list of players who have played at full international level.
  Marko Rakonjac
  Alen Stevanović
For a list of all FK IMT players with a Wikipedia article, see :Category:FK IMT players.

Managerial history

References

External links
 
 Club page at Srbijasport

1953 establishments in Serbia
Association football clubs established in 1953
Football clubs in Serbia
Football clubs in Belgrade
New Belgrade